Neringa Dangvydė was pen name of Neringa Macatė (previously Mikalauskienė) (6 February 1975 – 21 March 2020), a Lithuanian writer, poet, book illustrator, and literary critic. She is best known as the author of two children's books. Her debut book, Amber Heart, was published in 2013 and caused public controversy because it depicted same-sex relationships in a positive light. Dangvydė sued Lithuania for imposing limits on the distribution of the book at the European Convention on Human Rights. In January 2023, the case was ruled in her favor.

Biography 
Neringa Dangvydė was born in Vilnius, but spent her childhood and youth in Alytus, where she graduated from the 9th secondary school and an art school. She went to study philosophy at the Vilnius University but quickly switched to literary studies. She was a member of the Lithuanian Writers' Union (since 2017), as well as of the IBBY Lithuania (International Bilingual Literature and Young People's Literature Association). She died of cancer on 21 March 2020.

Dangvydė published two books for children: the collection of fairy tales Amber Heart (Gintarinė širdis, 2013) and the novel Child with a Star on the Forehead (Vaikas su žvaigžde kaktoje, 2016). The novel explored loneliness and ridicule faced by children from "incomplete" families. While the first book caused public controversy, the second book was awarded the Vytautas Tamulaitis Award which was established in 1998 by the Šakiai District Municipality. She also wrote poetry; the collection Kiaukuto nešėja was published posthumously in 2021. Monika Bertašiūtė-Čiužienė writing for 15min.lt selected the collection as top 11 of Lithuanian poetry books of 2021. The collection explores lesbian romance. Just before her death, she finished a novella for young adults Ripper (Plėšytojas) which has not been published. 

Dangvydė wrote literary criticism and published in journals active in the cultural field: Literatūra ir menas, Gimtasis žodis, Nemunas, Šiaurės Atėnai, Metai, The Vilnius Review, Ribinaitis.

Dangvydė was an accomplished translator.

Controversy over Amber Heart
The debut book Amber Heart stirred public controversy and scandal: the book was accused of promoting  "propaganda of homosexuality". The book was an attempt to rewrite classic children's literature, drawing inspiration from the Brothers Grimm or Hans Christian Andersen, to reflect modern social issues and include characters from marginalized social groups: different racial groups, people with disabilities, divorced families. Two out of six fairy tales were about same-sex relationships. The stories addressed issues such as exclusion, ghosting, and harassment. The book was republished in Lithuanian with new illustrations by Dangvydė in late 2014 by several human rights organizations in Lithuania.

Several associations representing families complained about the depiction of homosexual relations in Amber Heart. The Lithuanian Office of the Inspectorate of Journalistic Ethics ruled that the two stories with LGBT elements violated the Law on the Protection of Minors against the Detrimental Effects of Public Information. This law prohibits "expressing contempt for family values" or "promoting a view of marriage and family creation different from that enshrined in the Constitution or the Civil Code". The book published, the Press of the Lithuanian University of Educational Sciences, initially suspended the distribution of the book but later allowed it to be sold with a warning that it is not intended for children under 14 years of age. Lithuanian courts sided with the government, and Dangvydė summited a petition to the European Court of Human Rights arguing that Lithuania violated the European Convention on Human Rights which protects freedom of expression and prohibits discrimination. The case was relinquished to the Grand Chamber of the European Court of Human Rights which heard the arguments on 23 March 2022.

Works

References

External links
 Full-text English translation of Amber Heart

1975 births
2020 deaths
Lithuanian women poets
Lithuanian children's writers
21st-century Lithuanian women writers
Lithuanian LGBT rights activists
Translators to Lithuanian
People from Vilnius
Vilnius University alumni